The 2022 ARCA Menards Series West was the 69th season of the ARCA Menards Series West, a regional stock car racing series sanctioned by NASCAR in the United States. The season began on March 11 at Phoenix Raceway with the General Tire 150 and ended with the Desert Diamond Casino West Valley 100, also at Phoenix Raceway, on November 4.

Jesse Love, who won the championship for the last 2 years, did not go for a three-peat. Love revealed in an interview in October 2021 with Frontstretch that he would not return to the West Series full-time in 2022 and he ran the majority of the main ARCA Series season for Venturini Motorsports. He had driven for the team part-time in that series in 2020 and 2021.

This season also saw a historic milestone, as the race at Evergreen Speedway on August 20 marked the 1,000th West Series race.

Teams and drivers

Complete schedule

Limited schedule
Note: If a driver is listed as their own crew chief for a particular race, that means that their entry in that race was a start and park.

Notes

Changes

Teams
 On January 4, 2022, Kyle Keller, who drove part-time for Jerry Pitts Racing in 2020 and 2021, announced that he would start his own team, Kyle Keller Racing, which would field one full-time car with himself driving it for the full season. The car number would be the No. 12 in all races except the season-opener at Phoenix, where it was the No. 70. (That race was a combination race with the main ARCA Series where Fast Track Racing uses the No. 12.)
 On January 26, 2022, Chris Lowden, who drove part-time for Kart Idaho Racing in 2020, announced that he would start his own team, Lowden Motorsports, which would field one full-time car with himself driving it for the full season. Lowden's team would also have an alliance with KIR. The car number would be the No. 11 in all races except the season-opener at Phoenix, where it was the No. 21. (That race was a combination race with the main ARCA Series where Fast Track Racing uses the No. 11.)
 On the Irwindale March entry list, Trevor Huddleston, who drove full-time for Sunrise Ford Racing from 2019 to 2021, would start his own team, Huddleston Racing, which would field one part-time car with himself driving it for select races. Huddleston's team would also have an alliance with High Point Racing and Sunrise Ford Racing. The car number would be the No. 50.
 On September 28, 2022, it was announced that BMI Racing would field a second part-time car, the No. 97, at the Las Vegas Bullring which will be driven by Sarah Burgess, the owner of the team who is usually the crew chief of the team's No. 88 car driven by her daughter Bridget. It will mark the first time in series history that a mother and her daughter will compete against each other in a NASCAR or ARCA race.

Drivers
 On August 12, 2021, Bill McAnally Racing mentioned that it was possible that Sebastian Arias, one of the team's part-time drivers in 2021, could run full-time in the West Series for them in 2022. On March 25, 2022, it was announced that Arias would run seven races in the No. 4 car for Nascimento Motorsports in 2022. The No. 4 car was one of McAnally's part-time cars in 2021 but the Nascimento family (including 2021 BMR driver Eric and crew chiefs Henry and Mike) took over ownership of the car for 2022.
 On January 3, 2022, it was announced that Austin Herzog would replace Jesse Love in the Bill McAnally Racing No. 16 car. Those plans would later change on June 29, when it was announced that Landen Lewis would replace Herzog in the BMR No. 16 car.
 On January 18, 2022, it was announced that Andrew Tuttle would make his first full-time appearance in the ARCA West in his own No. 39.
 On January 28, 2022, it was announced that Tanner Reif would replace Trevor Huddleston in the Sunrise Ford Racing No. 9 car.
 On the Phoenix entry list, it was revealed that Eric Rhead would make his West Series debut in the No. 66 car for his own team, 66 Rhead Racing.
 On April 1, 2022, it was revealed that Christian Rose would attempt 9 races in the main ARCA series, 5 races in the East Series, and 3 races in the West Series for Cook Racing Technologies. On the KCR entry list, it was revealed that Landen Lewis would make his debut in the West Series in the No. 42.
 On the KCR entry list, it was revealed that Tripp Gaylord, the son of Scott Gaylord, would make his debut with the No. 77 for Joe Nava. On the Portland June entry list, it was revealed that Clark Lukens would make his debut in the car, but failed to do so. 
 On April 27, 2022, ARCA indefinitely suspended Daniel Dye due to his arrest on a felony battery charge in Volusia County, Florida. On May 13, ARCA announced that Dye would be reinstated after his charges were reduced by the Florida state attorney's office.
 On May 12, 2022, Vincent Delforge from Kickin' the Tires revealed that Davey Magras would make his West Series debut in the No. 14 car for his own team, Davey Magras Racing, in the race at Portland in September.
 On the Portland June entry list, it was revealed that Vince Little would make his debut in the No. 85 car for Last Chance Racing.
 On the Irwindale July entry list, it was revealed that Bradley Erickson would make his debut for Naake-Klauer Motorsports, which is his late model team. He drove a second car for the team, the No. 84.
 On the Evergreen entry list, it was revealed that David Smith (from Canada) would make his debut in the No. 05 car for Shockwave Motorsports.
 On the Evergreen entry list, it was revealed that Sean Hingorani would make his debut for Nascimento Motorsports, which is his late model team. He drove the No. 4 car.
 On September 30, 2022, it was announced that John Moore would make his first West Series start since 2015, driving the No. 27 car for Bill McAnally Racing in the race at All American Speedway. He is the father of Cole Moore, who drives full-time in the West Series in McAnally's No. 99 car, so the two of them would be teammates in the race. It would be the first time that they would race against each other in the West Series.
 On October 10, 2022, Vincent Delforge from Kickin' the Tires revealed that Tyler Reif, the brother of Tanner, would make his West Series debut in the No. 41 car for Lowden Motorsports, in the race at the Bullring in October.

Manufacturers
 On October 13, 2021, Bill McAnally Racing announced that they would be switching from Toyota to Chevrolet in 2022 and would have an alliance with GMS Racing. The team had been a Toyota team from 2008 to 2021 but was previously a Chevrolet team in 2007 and earlier. Due to the inability to build enough new Chevrolet road course cars in time, the team would end up fielding their old Toyotas unbadged in the road course races for all of their cars except the No. 16.

Schedule
Phoenix Raceway and Sonoma Raceway announced their 2022 race dates in tweets on September 29. The rest of the schedule was announced on November 19. The date of the season-finale at Phoenix would later be moved from Saturday, November 5 to Friday, November 4.

Note: The race at Phoenix in March was a combination race with the ARCA Menards Series (highlighted in gold).

Schedule changes
The 2022 schedule features 11 races, which is the same number of races that there were on the 2020 schedule. The 2021 schedule only had 9 races.

 Irwindale Speedway's August date moves to March. (The track's other race remains on the 4th of July weekend.)
 After being taken off the schedule in 2021, Kern County Raceway Park and Evergreen Speedway were both added back onto the 2022 schedule. Their races will be in April and August, respectively.
 Portland International Raceway was given a second race to be held on the first weekend of June, which is the same weekend as the track's new Xfinity Series race. As a result, the race at Sonoma Raceway was pushed back a week to the second weekend of June. The race at Sonoma will also go back to using the chute instead of the carousel, which was used in 2019 and 2021.
 Colorado National Speedway was taken off the schedule. This will be the first season since 2006 that the West Series will not have had a race at the track.
 The race at the Las Vegas Motor Speedway Bullring moves from September to October along with the weekend's Cup Series race at the big LVMS track.

Broadcasting
The TV lineup is similar to what it looked like in 2021, with NBC airing all of the non-combination races on tape delay and MAVTV airing the combination race at Phoenix (which is also the season-opener). However, USA Network will be the channel that the NBC races are aired on instead of NBCSN, which was shut down at the end of 2021.

NBC Sports TrackPass, which previously had the streaming rights to all of races, lost the rights to FloRacing.

Results and standings

Race results

Drivers' championship

Notes:
 The pole winner also receives 1 bonus point, similar to the previous ARCA points system used until 2019 and unlike NASCAR. 
 Additionally, after groups of 5 races of the season, drivers that compete in all 5 races receive 50 additional points. These points bonuses will be given after the races at Sonoma and the Las Vegas Bullring.
 Jake Drew, Todd Souza, Tanner Reif, Cole Moore, Austin Herzog, P. J. Pedroncelli, Joey Iest, Takuma Koga, Bridget Burgess and Paul Pedroncelli received this points bonus for having competed in the first 5 races of the season (Phoenix in March, Irwindale in April, Kern County, Portland in June, and Sonoma).

(key) Bold – Pole position awarded by time. Italics – Pole position set by final practice results or rainout. * – Most laps led. ** – All laps led.

See also
 2022 NASCAR Cup Series
 2022 NASCAR Xfinity Series
 2022 NASCAR Camping World Truck Series
 2022 ARCA Menards Series
 2022 ARCA Menards Series East
 2022 NASCAR Whelen Modified Tour
 2022 NASCAR Pinty's Series
 2022 NASCAR Mexico Series
 2022 NASCAR Whelen Euro Series
 2022 SRX Series

References

ARCA Menards Series
ARCA Menards Series West
ARCA Menards Series West
ARCA Menards Series West